Lucas Eduardo Ribeiro de Souza (born 16 June 2000), commonly known as Edu, is a Brazilian footballer who plays as a centre-back for Athletico Paranaense.

Club career

Cruzeiro
Born in Belo Horizonte, Minas Gerais, Edu was a Cruzeiro youth graduate. In June 2019, he was called up to the main squad by manager Mano Menezes, after the club sold Murilo Cerqueira to FC Lokomotiv Moscow.

Edu made his professional debut on 22 January 2020, replacing Jadsom in the 58th minute of a 2–0 Campeonato Mineiro home win against Boa Esporte. He scored his first senior goal on 13 February, netting his team's first in a 2–2 away draw against São Raimundo-RR, for the year's Copa do Brasil; he was also sent off in that match.

Athletico Paranaense
On 5 June 2020, Edu joined Série A side Athletico Paranaense on a four-year deal, as a replacement to OGC Nice-bound Robson Bambu.

References

External links
 

2000 births
Living people
Footballers from Belo Horizonte
Brazilian footballers
Association football defenders
Campeonato Paranaense players
Cruzeiro Esporte Clube players
Club Athletico Paranaense players